Ostrobothnians are a subgroup (Heimo) of the Finnish people who live in the areas of the historical province of Ostrobothnia in the northwestern parts of Finland.

History 
Ostrobothnians descend from Tavastians and Savonians, the latter started to settle in Ostrobothnia during the 1500s. 

A notable historical event involving the Ostrobothnians is the Cudgel War, in which peasants led by the local rebel leader Jaakko Ilkka rose in a revolt against the nobility during the Swedish rule.

Dialects 

The Central and North Ostrobothnian dialects have been influenced by the Savonian dialects.

Description and stereotypes  
The stereotypical Ostrobothnian is brave, calm and dependable.

Many Ostrobothnians are either Laestadians, or active in the Awakening movement (körttiläisyys).

Notable Ostrobothnians 
 Alvar Aalto, architect and designer
 Heidi Hautala, politician
 Antti Isotalo, criminal and Puukkojunkkari
 Jussi Jokinen, ice hockey player
 Kyösti Kallio, president of Finland between 1937-1940
 Mari Kiviniemi, politician
 Jorma Kontio, harness racing driver
 Petri Kontiola, ice hockey player
 Pekka Korpi, harness racing driver
 Timo Kotipelto, musician
 Vilho Lampi, painter
 Jari-Matti Latvala, rally driver
 Jarppi Leppälä, stunt performer and member of The Dudesons
 Juha Mieto, cross-country skier
 Teemu Mäki, artist and writer
 Antti Niemi, footballer
 Janne Niinimaa, ice hockey player
 Jorma Ollila, businessman and former CEO of Nokia
 Jorma Panula, conductor and composer
 Tero Pitkämäki, athlete
 Erkki Raappana, Major General
 Jukka Rautakorpi, ice hockey coach
 Topi Sorsakoski, singer
 Jutta Urpilainen, politician
 Hannu Väisänen, artist, painter and writer
 Juha Väätäinen, athlete
 Niilo Yli-Vainio, preacher

See also 
 Finns proper
 Tavastians

References 

Ethnic groups in Finland